Märkischer Kreis II is an electoral constituency (German: Wahlkreis) represented in the Bundestag. It elects one member via first-past-the-post voting. Under the current constituency numbering system, it is designated as constituency 150. It is located in southern North Rhine-Westphalia, comprising the northern part of the Märkischer Kreis district.

Märkischer Kreis II was created for the 1980 federal election. Since 2002, it has been represented by Paul Ziemiak of the Christian Democratic Union (CDU).

Geography
Märkischer Kreis II is located in southern North Rhine-Westphalia. As of the 2021 federal election, it comprises the entirety of the Märkischer Kreis district excluding the municipalities of Halver, Herscheid, Kierspe, Lüdenscheid, Meinerzhagen, and Schalksmühle.

History
Märkischer Kreis II was created in 1980. In the 1980 through 1998 elections, it was constituency 123 in the numbering system. From 2002 through 2009, it was number 151. Since 2013, it has been number 150.

Originally, the constituency comprised the municipalities of Lüdenscheid, Altena, Meinerzhagen, Kierspe, Plettenberg, Werdohl, Halver, Herscheid, and Schalksmühle from the Märkischer Kreis district. It acquired its current borders in the 2002 election.

Members
The constituency has been held by the Social Democratic Party (SPD) during all but two Bundestag terms since its creation. It was first represented by Günter Topmann from 1980 to 1983. Wolfgang Lohmann of the Christian Democratic Union (CDU) won it in 1983 and served a single term. Lisa Seuster regained it for the SPD in 1987, and served until 1998. Dieter Dzewas was then representative from 1998 to 2002. Dagmar Freitag was elected in 2002 and served until 2021. Paul Ziemiak won the constituency for the CDU in 2021.

Election results

2021 election

2017 election

2013 election

2009 election

References

Federal electoral districts in North Rhine-Westphalia
1980 establishments in West Germany
Constituencies established in 1980
Märkischer Kreis